Riccardo Cazzola (born 8 October 1985) is an Italian football midfielder for Serie D club Virtus Bergamo.

Club career
After not playing in the 2018–19 season, he joined Virtus Verona in July 2019.

On 21 July 2021 he joined to  Giana Erminio.

References

External links
 
 AIC profile
 

1985 births
Living people
Footballers from Verona
Italian footballers
Association football midfielders
Serie A players
Serie B players
Serie C players
Serie D players
A.S. Sambenedettese players
A.C. Perugia Calcio players
Vastese Calcio 1902 players
S.S. Arezzo players
Olbia Calcio 1905 players
U.S. Pergolettese 1932 players
S.S. Juve Stabia players
Atalanta B.C. players
A.C. Cesena players
U.S. Livorno 1915 players
U.S. Alessandria Calcio 1912 players
Virtus Verona players
A.S. Giana Erminio players
Virtus Bergamo Alzano Seriate 1909 players